Wendy Lee Motlong Masiello (born 1958 in Lubbock, Texas) retired as a lieutenant general in the United States Air Force on May 24, 2017.  From May 2014 to May 24, 2017, she was the director of the Defense Contract Management Agency, based in Fort Lee, Virginia.

Biography 
Masiello is a 1976 graduate of Lubbock's Monterey High School, where she was a member of the University Interscholastic League Mathematics Team and the National Honor Society and treasurer of the French Club. Masiello is a 1980 marketing alumna of Texas Tech University's Rawls College of Business. She received her commission from Texas Tech's Reserve Officers Training Corps (ROTC) at time of graduation. Her involvement with the Air Force had begun earlier as a member of Angel Flight, a student organization which supported Air Force ROTC at Texas Tech. In addition to training at various military schools, she obtained a Master of Science from Air Force Institute of Technology at Ohio's Wright-Patterson Air Force Base in 1984 and a second Master of Science from National Defense University in 1999.

Masiello has held a variety of systems acquisition roles, including principal contracting officer for surveillance and reconnaissance systems, weapon systems and test ranges. She was an assistant professor at the Air Force Institute of Technology and executive director for the National Reconnaissance Office inspector general. She has also served several staff, tours, including deputy director of plans and programs, and director of contracting at two systems acquisition centers.

Masiello commanded the 95th Air Base Wing, and from July 2005 through January 2006, she deployed to Iraq as principal assistant for contracting forces in Iraq/Afghanistan. Her responsibilities included contracting and acquisition support to forces in both countries, security transition support in Afghanistan, and humanitarian relief following the Pakistani earthquake. Prior to her current assignment, she was program executive officer for combat and mission support.

Lieutenant General Wendy Masiello is married to Thomas Joseph "Tom" Masiello, a retired Air Force major general. The couple have two sons, who are also in the Air Force.

Education 
1980 Bachelor of Business Administration degree in marketing, Texas Tech University, Lubbock, Texas
1984 Master of Science degree in logistics management (contracting and manufacturing management), Air Force Institute of Technology, Wright-Patterson AFB, Ohio
1986 Distinguished graduate, Squadron Officer School, Maxwell AFB, Ala.
1993 Distinguished graduate, Air Command and Staff College, Maxwell AFB, Ala. 1995 Program Management Course, Defense Systems Management College, Fort Belvoir, Va.
1999 Distinguished graduate, Master of Science degree in national resource strategy, Industrial College of the Armed Forces, Fort Lesley J. McNair, Washington, D.C.
1999 Senior Acquisition Course, Industrial College of the Armed Forces, Fort Lesley J. McNair, Washington, D.C.
2007 Joint and Combined Warfighting School, Joint Forces Staff College, Norfolk, Va.

Assignments 
 March 1981 - May 1983, procurement and production officer, Air Force Plant Representative Office, General Electric Space Systems Division, King of Prussia, Pa.
 June 1983 - September 1984, student, Air Force Institute of Technology, Wright-Patterson AFB, Ohio
 October 1984 - September 1987, instructor, Quantitative Contract Analysis, Air Force Institute of Technology, Wright-Patterson AFB, Ohio
 October 1987 - September 1988, air staff training officer, Tactical Programs and Space and Strategic Defense Directorates, Office of the Secretary of the Air Force (Acquisition), Washington, D.C.
 October 1988 - July 1992, deputy director of contracting branch, Office of Special Projects, Office of the Secretary of the Air Force, Los Angeles, Calif.
 July 1992 - June 1993, student, Air Command and Staff College, Maxwell AFB, Ala.
 July 1993 - September 1996, executive director, Office of Inspector General, National Reconnaissance Office, Chantilly, Va.
 October 1996 - July 1997, deputy chief of Weapons, Air Base and Range Contracting Division, Air Base and Range Program Office, Eglin AFB, Fla.
 August 1997 - July 1998, chief of Advanced Medium Range Air-to-Air Missile Contracting Division, Air-to-Air Joint Systems Program Office, Eglin AFB, Fla.
 August 1998 - June 1999, student, Industrial College of the Armed Forces, Fort Lesley J. McNair, Washington, D.C.
 July 1999 - October 2000, deputy director for plans and programs, Air Armament Center, Eglin AFB, Fla.
 October 2000 - July 2002, director of contracting, Air Armament Center, Eglin AFB, Fla.
 July 2002 - December 2002, vice commander of 95th Air Base Wing, Edwards AFB, Calif.
 December 2002 - July 2004, commander of 95th Air Base Wing, Edwards AFB, Calif.
 July 2004 - September 2006, director of contracting, Aeronautical Systems Center, Wright-Patterson AFB, Ohio (July 2005 - January 2006, principal assistant for contracting forces in Iraq/Afghanistan, Joint Contracting Command - Iraq/Afghanistan, Baghdad, Iraq)
 September 2006 - August 2007, associate deputy assistant secretary (contracting), Office of the Assistant Secretary of the Air Force for Acquisition, Washington, D.C.
 August 2007 - April 2011, program executive officer for combat and mission support, Office of the Assistant Secretary of the Air Force for Acquisition, Washington, D.C.
 May 2011 – May 2014, deputy assistant secretary (contracting), Office of the Assistant Secretary of the Air Force for Acquisition, Washington, D.C.
 May 2014 – May 2017, director of Defense Contract Management Agency

Awards and decorations

Other achievements 
Leadership Award, Air Command and Staff College
2011 Federal 100 Award

Effective dates of promotion

Notes

External links 

1958 births
Living people
Air Force Institute of Technology alumni

Dwight D. Eisenhower School for National Security and Resource Strategy alumni
Monterey High School (Lubbock, Texas) alumni
National Defense University alumni
People from Lubbock, Texas
Recipients of the Legion of Merit
Texas Tech University alumni
Female generals of the United States Air Force
Women in the Iraq War